Terry A. Davis (1969–2018) was an American programmer who created and designed the operating system TempleOS. 

Terry Davis may also refer to:

Terry Davis (American football), American football player
Terry Davis (author) (born 1947), American novelist 
Terry Davis (basketball) (born 1967), American former professional basketball player 
Terry Davis (politician) (born 1938), British Labour Party politician and Secretary General of the Council of Europe
Terry Davis (priest), Dean of St George's Cathedral, Georgetown, Guyana
Terry Davis (rower) (born 1958), Australian rower and beverage industry executive
Terry Acebo Davis (born 1953), Filipino-American artist and nurse

See also
Terence Davis (born 1997), American basketball player
Terry Davies (disambiguation)